Edward Stack may refer to:

 Edward Stack (U.S. Marine Corps officer) (1756–1833), officer in the United States Marine Corps during the American Revolutionary War
 Edward Stack (Wisconsin politician) (1918–2006), member of the Wisconsin State Assembly
 Edward J. Stack (1910–1989), U.S. Representative from Florida
 Edward W. Stack, American CEO and businessman